Stefano Botta (born 3 November 1986) is an Italian football midfielder.

Life
He was born in Como and is half Swiss.

Botta scored on the first match of the 2009–10 season, in a Coppa Italia match 1-2 lost to Cremonese.

On 1 July 2017, he joined Serie C side Bassano.

References

External links
 Profile
 

1986 births
Living people
Italian footballers
FC Lugano players
Genoa C.F.C. players
A.C. Cesena players
L.R. Vicenza players
Ternana Calcio players
Virtus Entella players
S.S.D. Lucchese 1905 players
Reggina 1914 players
Bassano Virtus 55 S.T. players
Vis Pesaro dal 1898 players
Swiss Challenge League players
Serie B players
Serie C players
Sportspeople from Como
Association football midfielders
Footballers from Lombardy